Martin James Riley (born May 8, 1955) is a former Olympian as a member of the Canadian national basketball team. Riley currently resides in Winnipeg Manitoba where he used to teach a sports psychology class (healthy lifestyles), but now teaches science to high school students. Also at the same school he teachers a sociology course and online law.

Born in Winnipeg, Manitoba, Riley played high school basketball at Sisler High School and college basketball at the University of Manitoba where he was named CIAU Player of the Year in 1976 and All-Canadian in 1976, '77, and '78.

Riley was a member of the Canadian senior national team as a high schooler in 1973.  The 1976 Olympic Canadian team finished just out of the medals in fourth place.  Riley was captain of the 1980 team that did not participate in  Moscow due to the boycott of the games of by the Canadian Olympic Committee.  He also represented his country at the 1974 and 1978 FIBA World Championship, 1975 and 1979 Pan Am Games, as well as the 1977 and 1979 World University Games.

Riley was a member of the (amateur) Nicolet Inn basketball club which won the Canadian Senior Men's Championship in 1979 and 1980.  He played professionally in Argentina during the 1980–1 season.

Inducted into the Manitoba Sports Hall of Fame and Museum in 1991.

Sources

 

1954 births
Living people
Basketball players from Winnipeg
Basketball players at the 1976 Summer Olympics
Basketball players at the 1975 Pan American Games
Basketball players at the 1979 Pan American Games
Canadian men's basketball players
1974 FIBA World Championship players
1978 FIBA World Championship players
Canadian expatriate basketball people in Argentina
Manitoba Bisons basketball players
Olympic basketball players of Canada
Pan American Games competitors for Canada
Manitoba Sports Hall of Fame inductees